Písečná (until 1948 Sandhýbl) is a municipality and village in Jeseník District in the Olomouc Region of the Czech Republic. It has about 1,000 inhabitants.

Administrative parts
The village of Studený Zejf and the hamlet of Chebzí are administrative parts of Písečná.

History
A large village called Waltersdorf was located somewhere in the area of the today's municipality. It was first mentioned in 1284 and extinct before 1420. Today's Písečná is rather associated with another village or part of the village called Wüstekirche, which was first mentioned in 1373 and abandoned after 1443. A hundred years later, the area was resettled again and named Sandhübel.

In the 16th century, the settlement was part of the Duchy of Nysa under Bohemian suzerainty. After the duchy's dissolution in 1850, it was incorporated directly into Bohemia. Following World War I, from 1918, it formed part of Czechoslovakia, and from 1938 to 1945 it was occupied by Germany.

During the occupation (World War II), the Germans operated three forced labour subcamps of the Stalag VIII-B/344 prisoner-of-war camp in the village. The Allied POWs worked at the local brickworks (subcamp E174), paper mill (E175) and quarry (E401).

References

External links

Villages in Jeseník District
16th-century establishments in Bohemia
Populated places established in the 16th century
Czech Silesia